The Pingat Jasa Gemilang (Tentera) is a decoration awarded to members of the Singapore Armed Forces for exceptionally distinguished performance or extraordinary service, or the furtherance of links with overseas forces.

Recipients are entitled to use the post-nominal letters PJG

The Pingat Jasa Gemilang is the civil equivalent award.

Description

 The ribbon white with dark red edges and edge stripes, and a purple-edged white central stripe.

Recipients

Singapore
 2007 – Lieutenant General Ng Yat Chung – Chief of Defence Force
 2012 – Lieutenant General Neo Kian Hong- Chief of Defence Force
 (unknown) – Lieutenant General Perry Lim – Chief of Defence Force

Australia
 1985 – Vice Admiral David Leach – Chief of Naval Staff
 1997 – Vice Admiral Rodney Taylor – Chief of Navy
 2003 – Air Chief Marshal Angus Houston – Chief of Defence Force
 2007 – Lieutenant General Peter Leahy – Chief of Army
 2007 – Air Marshal Geoff Shepherd – Chief of Air Force
 2010 – Lieutenant General Ken Gillespie – Chief of Army
 2010 – Air Marshal Mark Binskin – Vice Chief of the Defence Force
 2011 – Vice Admiral Russell Crane – Chief of Navy
 2013 – Lieutenant General David Morrison – Chief of Army
 2014 – Air Marshal Geoff Brown – Chief of Air Force
 2014 – Vice Admiral Ray Griggs – Chief of Navy
 2016 – Vice Admiral Tim Barrett – Chief of Navy
 2016 – Air Marshal Leo Davies – Chief of Air Force
 2017 – Lieutenant General Angus Campbell – Chief of Army
 2021 – Air Marshal Mel Hupfeld – Chief of Air Force
 2021 – Lieutenant General Rick Burr – Chief of Army
 2022 – Vice Admiral Michael Noonan – Chief of Navy

Brunei
 (unknown) – Major General Halbi Mohd Yussof – Commander of Royal Brunei Armed Forces
 2007 – Colonel Rosli Chuchu – Commander of Royal Brunei Land Forces
 2010 – Major General Aminuddin Ihsan – Commander of Royal Brunei Armed Forces
 2011 – First Admiral Abdul Halim – Commander of the Royal Brunei Navy
 2015 – First Admiral Abdul Aziz – Commander of the Royal Brunei Navy
 2016 – Brigadier General Aminan Mahmud – Commander of Royal Brunei Land Forces
 2017 – Brigadier General Shahril Anwar – Commander of the Royal Brunei Air Force
 2019 – Brigadier General Khairul Hamed – Commander of Royal Brunei Land Forces
 2020 – Major General Hamzah Sahat – Commander of Royal Brunei Armed Forces
 2022 – Brigadier General Mohammad Sharif – Commander of the Royal Brunei Air Force
 2022 – Major General Muhammad Haszaimi – Commander of Royal Brunei Armed Forces
 2022 – Brigadier General Abdul Razak – Deputy Minister of Defence

Sweden
 1998 – Vice Admiral Peter Nordbeck – Chief of Navy Command
 2004 – Rear Admiral Jörgen Ericsson – Inspector of the Navy
 2007 – Rear Admiral Anders Grenstad – Inspector of the Navy
 2014 – Rear Admiral Jan Thörnqvist – Chief of Navy

United States

 2008 – General T. Michael Moseley – Chief of Staff of the Air Force
 2008 – Admiral Gary Roughead – Chief of Naval Operations
 2009 – General George W. Casey, Jr. – Chief of Staff of the Army
 2013 – Admiral Jonathan Greenert – Chief of Naval Operations
 2017 – Admiral Harry B. Harris Jr. – Commander, U.S. Pacific Command
 2017 – Admiral John M. Richardson – Chief of Naval Operations
 2022 – General Charles Q. Brown Jr. – Chief of Staff of the Air Force

France
 2012 – General Jean-Paul Paloméros – Chief of Staff of the Air Force
 2014 – General Denis Mercier – Chief of Staff of the Air Force

Thailand
 2000 – General Surayud Chulanont – Commander in Chief of the Royal Thai Army
 2001 – Air Chief Marshal Sanan Thuathip – Commander of the Royal Thai Air Force
 2003 – Air Chief Marshal Kongsak Vantana – Commander of the Royal Thai Air Force
 2004 – Admiral Taweesak Somapha – Commander of the Royal Thai Navy
 2004 – General Chaiyasit Shinawatra – Commander in Chief of the Royal Thai Army
 2004 – Air Chief Marshal Napadej Dhupatemiya – Commander of the Royal Thai Air Force
 2009 – Air Chief Marshal Itthaporn Subhawong – Commander of the Royal Thai Air Force
 2010 – Admiral Khamthorn Pumhiran – Commander of the Royal Thai Navy
 2012 – General Anupong Paochinda – Commander in Chief of the Royal Thai Army
 2013 – Admiral Surasak Runroengrom – Commander of the Royal Thai Navy
 2013 – Air Chief Marshal Prajin Juntong – Commander of the Royal Thai Air Force
 2015 – General Prayut Chan-o-cha – Commander in Chief of the Royal Thai Army
 2015 – Air Chief Marshal Treetod Sonjance – Commander of the Royal Thai Air Force
 2017 – General Thirachai Nakwanich – Commander in Chief of the Royal Thai Army
 2018 – Admiral Naris Pratumsuwan – Commander of the Royal Thai Navy
 2018 – General Chalermchai Sitthisart – Commander in Chief of the Royal Thai Army
 2018 – Air Chief Marshal Johm Rungsawang – Commander of the Royal Thai Air Force
 2019 – Air Chief Marshal Chaiyapruk Didyasarin – Commander of the Royal Thai Air Force
 2023 – General Narongpan Jitkaewtrue – Commander in Chief of the Royal Thai Army
 (unknown) – General Prawit Wongsuwon

Indonesia
 1992 – Air Chief Marshal Siboen Dipoatmodjo – Chief of Staff of the Indonesian Air Force
 1992 – Admiral Muhamad Arifin – Chief of Staff of the Indonesian Navy
 1995 – Admiral Tanto Kuswanto – Chief of Staff of the Indonesian Navy
 1996 – General R. Hartono – Chief of Staff of the Indonesian Army
 1997 – General Wiranto – Chief of Staff of the Indonesian Army
 1999 – General Subagyo Hadi Siswoyo – Chief of Staff of the Indonesian Army
 2001 – General Tyasno Sudarto – Chief of Staff of the Indonesian Army
 2006 – Air Chief Marshal Djoko Suyanto – Chief of Staff of the Indonesian Air Force
 2009 – General Agustadi Sasongko Purnomo – Chief of Staff of the Indonesian Army
 2009 – Air Chief Marshal Soebandrio – Chief of Staff of the Indonesian Air Force
 2011 – General George Toisutta – Chief of Staff of the Indonesian Army
 2011 – Air Chief Marshal Imam Sufaat – Chief of Staff of the Indonesian Air Force
 2012 – General Pramono Edhie Wibowo – Chief of Staff of the Indonesian Army
 2013 – General Moeldoko – Commander of the Indonesian National Armed Forces
 2015 – Air Chief Marshal Ida Bagus Putu Dunia – Chief of Staff of the Indonesian Air Force
 2015 – General Budiman – Chief of Staff of the Indonesian Army
 2015 – Admiral Marsetio – Chief of Staff of the Indonesian Navy
 2016 – General Gatot Nurmantyo – Commander of the Indonesian National Armed Forces
 2017 – Air Chief Marshal Agus Supriatna – Chief of Staff of the Indonesian Air Force
 2017 – Admiral Ade Supandi – Chief of Staff of the Indonesian Navy
 2018 – Air Chief Marshal Hadi Tjahjanto – Commander of the Indonesian National Armed Forces
 2018 – General Mulyono – Chief of Staff of the Indonesian Army
 2022 – General Andika Perkasa – Commander of the Indonesian National Armed Forces
 2022 – Air Chief Marshal Yuyu Sutisna – Chief of Staff of the Indonesian Air Force
 2022 – Admiral Yudo Margono – Chief of Staff of the Indonesian Navy
 2022 – Air Chief Marshal Fadjar Prasetyo – Chief of Staff of the Indonesian Air Force

References

World Medals PJG page

Military awards and decorations of Singapore